Elephant Nature Park is a sanctuary and rescue centre for elephants in Mae Taeng District, Chiang Mai Province, Northern Thailand, approximately  from Chiang Mai City, co-founded by Sangduen "Lek" (Thai for "Small") Chailert.  In 2013 Erawan Elephant Retirement Park opened in western Thailand as an offshoot.  By 2016 there were branch elephant parks in Surin and in Cambodia, and there were plans to open a fifth park in Phuket. By then the work was coordinated by the Save the Elephant Foundation.

The parks provide sanctuary for rescued elephants and operate under a business model in which tourists pay to visit and help care for the animals, and can stay for extended periods.

History 
Lek Chailert started working on elephant conservation in 1996. Teak logging, in which many elephants were used, had been banned in Thailand in 1989, and those elephants had been abandoned or sold for use in the tourist industry or for begging in cities. Elephants are also left maimed after poachers take their ivory.

In the late 1990s the government of Thailand was working to promote ecotourism in Chiang Mai Province; tourism brought in 350 million dollars in 1997 and was the province's biggest source of revenue; the ecotourism plans were controversial with indigenous people there.

By 1998, an organization called Green Tours run by Adam Flinn had founded Elephant Nature Park, a tourist site and reserve for rescued elephants in a valley about an hour north of Chiang Mai, with Chailert, who owned some of the land and leased some from the Thai government.  At that time the park featured a daily elephant show where elephants performed tricks like balancing on one leg and playing football, and included elephant rides.  She maintained a more isolated section up one of the surrounding mountains for especially damaged animals that she called "Elephant Heaven."  The park had 34 rescued elephants.  Her goal was to eventually end the performances and run it purely as a reserve.

By 2002 Chailert was well known for campaigning against elephant crushing  and around that time a documentary about the treatment of elephants in Thailand featuring Chailert's work was released; in response, PETA called for a boycott of Thailand until conditions there changed.

By 2005 the boycott campaign had made Chailert an embarrassment to the Thai government and had led to death threats and to Friends of the Asian Elephant, a government-funded organization that had done work to improve conditions for elephants, ending its funding for Chailert's work. Chailert was listed in a special 2005 post-tsunami issue of the Asian edition of Time magazine as one of "Asia's heroes".  By 2005 17 of the elephants Chailert had rescued were adults, and she had also opened a travel agency in Chiang Mai. By this time the park no longer offered performances and had shifted to a business model in which visitors could come help care for the elephants.

In 2010 the park had 33 elephants and visitors could come for up to 28 days, paying $400/week.

In 2013 Erawan Elephant Retirement Park opened in western Thailand on 50 hectares of land beside the River Kwai an hour from Kanchanaburri, as an extension of the original park and using the same business model; it opened with five elephants, one of which died in the first year.  In 2014 there were 37 elephants at Elephant Nature Park.

As of 2016, Chailert had rescued a total of 200 distressed elephants since she started in 1996 and there were branch elephant parks in Surin and in Cambodia, and there were plans to open a fifth park in Phuket.  That work is coordinated by the Save the Elephant Foundation, run by the same people.

Recognition and improvements 

For her work, Chailert received recognition and numerous awards, such as the Ford Foundation's Hero of the Planet (2001), Time magazine's Heroes of Asia (2005), one of six Women Heroes of Global Conservation (2010), and the Responsible Thailand Award for Animal Welfare (2018). In addition to the elephants, Chailert has accommodated over 400 dogs, cats, birds and water buffaloes at the park. She also convinced several independent camps to improve the lives of elephants and forbid tourists from riding them through her Saddle Off! outreach program.

In 2011, with the help of Elephant Aid International a report was made to help the care of elephants in the Elephant Nature Park (to improve foot disease, mahout training and management. Improve of elephants' diet, sanitation, exercise, and stress levels, and disapproved of tourists having direct contact with the elephants.

Since 2018 the elephants have had less close contact with volunteers and visitors. Elephants bathe themselves with no visitor interaction. This is part of Elephant Nature Park's desire to offer elephants a chance to live as natural a life as possible.

Gallery

References

External links

 
 segments from Vanishing Giants, documentary film by Jennifer Hile via National Geographic.  October 2005.
 

Elephant sanctuaries
Animal welfare organizations based in Thailand
Nature conservation in Thailand
Tourist attractions in Thailand
Elephants in Thailand